Eleutherodactylus ronaldi is a species of frog in the family Eleutherodactylidae endemic to Cuba. Its natural habitats are subtropical or tropical moist lowland forest and subtropical or tropical moist montane forest.
It is threatened by habitat loss.

References

ronaldi
Endemic fauna of Cuba
Amphibians of Cuba
Amphibians described in 1960
Taxa named by Albert Schwartz (zoologist)
Taxonomy articles created by Polbot